The Primetime Emmy Award for Outstanding Narrator is awarded to one individual each year.

In 2014, the Primetime Emmy Award for Outstanding Voice-Over Performance was separated into two categories – Outstanding Narrator and Outstanding Character Voice-Over Performance. Rules hold that the "submission must be performed/read as a traditional narration and may not be audio lifted from an on-camera performance or interview. If the narration is performed in the first person as a character rather than the narrator, even if credited as narrator, it should be submitted in the character voice-over category."

In the following list, the first titles listed in gold are the winners; those not in gold are nominees, which are listed in alphabetical order. The years given are those in which the ceremonies took place:

Winners and nominations

1990s

2010s

2020s

Performers with multiple wins
Total include wins for Outstanding Voice-Over Performance.

3 wins
 David Attenborough
 Keith David

2 wins
 Jeremy Irons

Performers with multiple nominations
Total include nominations for Outstanding Voice-Over Performance.

7 nominations
 David Attenborough

4 nominations
 Liev Schreiber

3 nominations
 Keith David
 Anthony Mendez

2 nominations
 Kareem Abdul-Jabbar
 Angela Bassett
 Charles Dance
 Laurence Fishburne
 Jeremy Irons
 Lupita Nyong'o
 Henry Strozier

Notes

References

Narrator
 
Voice acting awards